Orlando Gutiérrez Callejo (born 18 March 1976 in Laredo, Cantabria), known simply as Orlando, is a Spanish retired footballer who played as a full back – on either side of the pitch.

External links

1976 births
Living people
People from Laredo, Cantabria
Spanish footballers
Footballers from Cantabria
Association football defenders
La Liga players
Segunda División B players
Tercera División players
Real Valladolid Promesas players
Real Valladolid players
SD Eibar footballers
Hércules CF players
UE Lleida players
CD Castellón footballers
FC Cartagena footballers
Lorca Deportiva CF footballers
Pontevedra CF footballers
Cultural Leonesa footballers
Barakaldo CF footballers
Club Portugalete players